Scripta Materialia is a peer-reviewed scientific journal. It is the "letters" section of Acta Materialia and covers novel properties, or substantially improved properties of materials. Specific materials discussed are metals, ceramics and semiconductors at all length scales, and published research endeavors explore the functional or mechanical behavior of these materials. Articles tend to focus on the materials science and engineering aspects of discovery, characterization, development (including advances), structure, chemistry, theory, experiment, modeling, simulation, physics processes (thermodynamics, mechanics, etc.), synthesis, processing (production), mechanisms, and control.

The journal also publishes comments on papers published in both Acta Materialia and Scripta Materialia and "Viewpoint Sets", which are sets of short articles invited by guest editors. The editor-in-chief is Christopher A. Schuh, Danae and Vasilis Salapatas Professor of Metallurgy at the Massachusetts Institute of Technology, who also edits Acta Materialia.

History 
The journal was established in 1967 as Scripta Metallurgica. It was renamed Scripta Metallurgica et Materialia in 1990, finally obtaining its current name in 1996.

Abstracting and indexing 
The journal is abstracted and indexed in:

According to the Journal Citation Reports, the journal has a 2020 impact factor of 5.611.

References

External links 
 http://www.journals.elsevier.com/scripta-materialia/
 
Biweekly journals
Elsevier academic journals
Engineering journals
English-language journals
Materials science journals
Publications established in 1967